List of SFR Yugoslavia national rugby union players is a list of people who have played for the Yugoslavia national rugby union team. 
The list includes all players who have played for Yugoslavia in a Test match and official games between 1968 and 1991.

In total 226 players played for Yugoslavia in 116 games and 189 players played in 66 Test games.

Plavi No.1 is Dusan Novakov, captain in the first game played against  XV.

The last, Plavi No.226, Aleksandar Jakisic made debut as 18-years old in the last game, versus  in 1991.

1 to 50

50 to 100

101 to 150

150 to 200

201 to 226

Bibliography 
 Proslo je 30 godina,anniversary book,  1985, published by SFR Yugoslavia Rugby Union
 20 godina Ragbi kluba Zagreb, 1984, published by RK Zagreb
 10 godina ragbija na Makarskoj rivijeri 1968–1978, published by RK Energoinvest Makarska
 50 godina Ragbi kluba Nada 1959–2009, published by RK Nada Split

References

External links 
 Croatia Rugby Union website
 Slovenia Rugby Union website
 Serbia Rugby Union website

Rugby union in Yugoslavia